Knyazhovo is a rural locality (a village) in Mayskoye Rural Settlement, Vologodsky District, Vologda Oblast, Russia. The population was 19 as of 2002.

Geography 
Knyazhovo is located 31 km northwest of Vologda (the district's administrative centre) by road. Pochenga is the nearest rural locality.

References 

Rural localities in Vologodsky District